Robert W. Justice was a state legislator in New York. He represented New York City's 19th District in the New York Assembly. He served from 1936 to 1938 and was preceded by James E. Stephens and succeeded by Daniel L. Burrows.

In 1936 he sought to have a building for "Negro" exhibits included at New York's Fair.

He introduced a bill to protect street lottery ("numbers") players from being arrested and charged.

He was part of the Conference for Legislation in the National Interest. Justice is listed as a subject in the New York Public Library's Ewart Guinier photographic collection.

See also
List of African-American officeholders (1900-1959)
159th New York State Legislature
161st New York State Legislature

References

20th-century African-American politicians
20th-century American politicians
Politicians from New York City
Democratic Party members of the New York State Assembly
African-American state legislators in New York (state)
Year of birth missing
Year of death missing
African-American men in politics